Captain William Lyford Jr. was born in the year 1719 on the island of New Providence in the Bahamas. He was a Captain of many ships transporting goods between North American colonies and the Caribbean. He was also a privateer and loyalist. The gated community Lyford Cay in Nassau, Bahamas is named after him.

References

1719 births
People from New Providence
Colony of the Bahamas people
Year of death missing